Hatbor Kendriya Natya Samaj, established in 1953, is a leading culture institution of the Nagaon district in the state of Assam in India. The group aims to propagate the Satriya and other folk art amongst different communities of the region and has taken up schemes for the publicity of arts like the Ankia Bhaona, Bihu, Satriya dance etc. both in and outside the state. The artiste of Hatbor Kendriya Natya Samaj have performed cultural shows such as the Ankia Bhaona at different places like the International Trade Fair, New Delhi, Ramayan Mela in Ayodhya, UP, Octave Festival in Mumbai, Poorvottar Natya Samaroh organized by National School of Drama in Tripura. The group also provides training of these forms.

References

Nagaon
Cultural organisations based in India
Organisations based in Assam
1953 establishments in Assam
Culture of Assam
Organizations established in 1953